Andrew Kumagai (熊谷 アンドリュー, Kumagai Andoryū, born 6 June 1993) is a Japanese football player who play as a Midfielder. He currently play for JEF United Chiba.

Career
On 6 January 2017, Kumagai was loaned to J2 club, JEF United Chiba for ahead of 2017 season.

Kumagai announcement officially permanent transfer to JEF United Chiba after loan a season in club.

Personal life
Kumagai was born in Kanagawa, Japan. He is Sri Lankan Tamil descent through his father is Sri Lanka and Japanese mother.

Career statistics

Club
.

1Includes Emperor's Cup.
2Includes J. League Cup.

Honours
Yokohama F. Marinos
Emperor's Cup: 2013

References

External links
Profile at JEF United Chiba

1993 births
Living people
Association football people from Kanagawa Prefecture
Japanese footballers
Japan youth international footballers
J1 League players
J2 League players
J3 League players
Yokohama F. Marinos players
Shonan Bellmare players
Zweigen Kanazawa players
JEF United Chiba players
J.League U-22 Selection players
Association football midfielders
Japanese people of Sri Lankan Tamil descent